Abdul Kadir Yusof (10 September 1917 – 18 April 1992) was a Malaysian politician. A lawyer by profession, Abdul Kadir held the posts of Attorney General and Solicitor-General at various points during his lifetime. He was also the Minister of Law. Together with his wife Fatimah Hashim, former Welfare Minister, Abdul Kadir represented one half of the first couple to be on the Malaysian cabinet.

Life
Abdul Kadir was born in Parit Sakai, Muar, Johor in 1917. During his lifetime, he was a member of the United Malays National Organisation, the leading party in the ruling coalition Barisan Nasional. He was a Tenggaroh State Assemblyman.

Family
Kadir is survived by his wife, politician Tun Fatimah Hashim, six children, nineteen grandchildren and 11 great-grandchildren.

His eldest daughter, Mariam, was the Director of the Malaysian National Library and is now retired. His second son, Mohamed Shah, has now retired as Chairman of McDonald's Malaysia and Founder of Ronald McDonald's Children's Charity (RMCC) Malaysia. His third son, Professor Emeritus Dato' Dr Khalid Abdul Kadir was previously the Director of Hospital UKM, Kuala Lumpur, and is now the Dean of Medicine at Monash University Malaysia. His fourth son Datuk Ali Abdul Kadir is an accomplished accountant who has held such prestigious positions as Chairman of Ernst & Young, Chairman of the Securities Commission Malaysia, and recently retired as Chairman of Dubai Investment Group. His fifth son Abdul Karim is in business and adviser to a few public and private companies following a 17-year working stint in Japan. Faridah, his youngest daughter is also an adviser to a Danish Investment Bank.

Death
Abdul Kadir died of lung cancer at his home in Kuala Lumpur on 18 April 1992 and was buried in Makam Pahlawan near Masjid Negara, Kuala Lumpur.

Foundation
The Yayasan Kadir & Fatimah (Yayasan K&F) confers the Tan Sri Abdul Kadir Gold Medal Award to UIA (Faculty of Law for the best Syariah Law student) and to UKM (Faculty of Law for the best Law Student).  The Tan Sri Abdul Kadir Gold Medal is also awarded to the student who tops the Accounting Law paper for CPA. The Yayasan recently started conferring the Tun Fatimah medal for the best female student active in community work for the first time in September 2007 and will be awarded annually to Universiti Malaya, Universiti Teknologi Mara and Universiti Teknologi Malaysia students.

Yayasan K&F continues to support public primary schools in Johor and Kedah, organise the annual Tan Sri Abdul Kadir Charity Golf Tournament to raise funds, and numerous other charitable causes through Abdul Kadir and Fatimah's children and grandchildren.

Legacy
Several projects and institutions were named after him, including:
 Dewan Tan Sri Abdul Kadir Yusuf in Attorney General Chambers in Putrajaya.
 Perpustakaan Tan Sri Abdul Kadir Yusuf in Seremban, Negeri Sembilan.
 Sekolah Menengah Kebangsaan Tan Sri Abdul Kadir in Mersing, Johor.
 Sekolah Agama Tan Sri Abdul Kadir in Endau, Johor.

Honours

Honours of Malaysia
  :
  Recipient of the Malaysian Commemorative Medal (Silver) (PPM) (1965)
  Commander of the Order of the Defender of the Realm (PMN) – Tan Sri (1966)
  :
  Knight Grand Commander of the Order of the Crown of Johor (SPMJ) – Dato' (1973)
  Knight Grand Companion of the Order of Loyalty of Sultan Ismail of Johor (SSIJ) – Dato' (1976)
  :
  Grand Commander of the Order of Kinabalu (SPDK) – Datuk Seri Panglima

References

1917 births
1992 deaths
Government ministers of Malaysia
Malaysian people of Malay descent
Malaysian Muslims
People from Muar
Deaths from lung cancer
20th-century Malaysian lawyers
United Malays National Organisation politicians
Members of the Dewan Rakyat
Members of the Dewan Negara
Attorneys General of Malaysia
Commanders of the Order of the Defender of the Realm
Knights Grand Commander of the Order of the Crown of Johor
Grand Commanders of the Order of Kinabalu
Justice ministers of Malaysia
Deaths from cancer in Malaysia